Hybotidae, the typical dance flies, are a family of true flies. They belong to the superfamily Empidoidea and were formerly included in the Empididae as a subfamily.

Some, such as Tachydromia, are predators that run around on the bark of trees in complex patterns, hence the common name. Tachydromia species are only about three millimeters long.

Description

Hybotidae share some similarities with the family Dolichopodidae, when looking at rotation of genitalia and wing characteristics. Male terminalia are rotated dextrally between 45° and 90°, excluding segment 7. Hybotidae wings always have a simple R4+5 vein, where the costa either ends near or at M1/M1+2, or near or at R4+5/R5. Furthermore, it can be distinguished from Dolichopodidae by the point of vein Rs, which it at a distance from the humeral crossvein (h) equal to or longer than the length of h.

Systematics
The Hybotidae clearly form a lineage quite distinct from the Empididae. Among the Empidoidea, they represent a lineage more basal than the main radiation of Empididae and Dolichopodidae, though they are not as ancient as the genera placed in the Atelestidae.

By and large, the Hybotidae are monophyletic. Among its subfamilies, the Hybotinae and Tachydromiinae certainly represent clades. The status of the Ocydromiinae as a natural group is less clear, in particular whether the Trichininae should be included as tribe Trichinini or even in the Bicellariini or Oedaleini, or whether they are more distinct and warrant recognition as a separate subfamily.

Based on the most recent phylogenetic studies, the relationship between Hybotidae and other members of Empidoidea is as follows. The placement of Hybotidae is emphasized in bold formatting.

Systematic list

The subfamilies with their tribes and selected genera are:

Hybotinae Meigen, 1820

 Acarterus  Loew, 1858
 Afrohybos Smith, 1967
 Ceratohybos  Bezzi 
 Chillcottomyia Saigusa, 1986
 Euhybus  Coquillett, 1895 
†Eternia Martins-Neto et al. 1992 Tremembé Formation, Brazil, Chattian
 Hybos Meigen, 1803
 Lactistomyia Melander, 1902
 Lamachella Melander, 1928
 Neohybos Ale-Rocha & Carvalho, 2003
 Parahybos  Kertész, 1899
†Pseudoacarterus Waters 1989 Orapa, Botswana, Turonian
 Smithybos Ale-Rocha, 2000
 Stenoproctus Loew, 1858
 Syndyas Loew, 1857  
 Syneches Walker, 1852
†Syneproctus Solórzano-Kraemer et al. 2020 Dominican amber, Miocene

Ocydromiinae

 Tribe Bicellariini Bradley, Sinclair & Cumming, 2006
 Bicellaria Macquart, 1823
 Hoplocyrtoma
 Leptocyrtoma
 Tribe Ocydromiini
 Leptodromiella Tuomikoski, 1936
 Leptopeza Macquart, 1834 
 Ocydromia Meigen, 1820 
 Oropezella Collin, 1926
 Tribe Oedaleini Chvála, 1983
 Allanthalia Melander, 1927
 Anthalia Zetterstedt, 1838
 Euthyneura Macquart, 1836
 Oedalea Meigen, 1820
†Ecommocydromia Schlüter 1978 Bezonnais amber, France, Cenomanian
†Pouillonhybos Ngô-Muller et al. 2020, Burmese amber, Myanmar, Cenomanian

Trichininae (often included in Ocydromiinae)
 Trichina Meigen, 1830
 Trichinomyia Tuomikoski, 1959

 Tribe Symballophthalmini Bradley, Sinclair & Cumming, 2006
 Symballophthalmus Becker, 1889
 Tribe Drapetini Collin, 1961
 Allodromia Smith, 1962
 Atodrapetis Plant, 1997
 Austrodrapetis Smith, 1964
 Austrodromia Collin, 1961
 Chaetodromia Chillcott & Teskey, 1983
 Chersodromia Haliday in Walker, 1851
 Crossopalpus Bigot, 1857
 Drapetis Meigen, 1822
 Dusmetina Gil Collado, 1930
 Elaphropeza Macquart, 1827
 Isodrapetis Collin, 1961
 Megagrapha Melander, 1928
 Micrempis Melander, 1928
 Nanodromia Grootaert, 1994
 Ngaheremyia Plant & Didham, 2006
 Pontodromia Grootaert, 1994
 Sinodrapetis Yang, Gaimari & Grootaert, 2004
 Stilpon Loew, 1859
Tribe Tachydromiini
 Charadrodromia Melander, 1928
 Dysaletria Loew, 1864
 Pieltainia Arias, 1919
 Platypalpus Macquart, 1827
 Tachydromia Meigen, 1803
 Tachyempis Melander, 1928
 Tachypeza Meigen, 1830

†Archaeodrapetiops Martins-Neto et al. 1992 Tremembé Formation, Brazil, Chattian
†Cretoplatypalpus Kovalev 1978 Taimyr amber, Russia, Santonian, Canadian amber, Campanian
†Electrocyrtoma Cockerell 1917 Burmese amber, Myanmar, Cenomanian
†Mesoplatypalpus Grimaldi and Cumming 1999 Canadian amber, Campanian

Incertae sedis

†Trichinites Hennig 1970 Lebanese amber, Barremian

References

External links

 Family description 
 Images at Diptera.info
  Key to UK genera

 
Brachycera families
Articles containing video clips